Aaron Goldberg (November 4, 1917 – December 13, 2014) was an American botanist and parasitologist. He died in December 2014 at the Holy Cross Hospital in Silver Spring, Maryland, at the age of 97.

Career 
Ph.D. (1962) George Washington University
He received his B.A. in 1939 from Brooklyn College, an M.S. in 1954 from De Paul University, and a Ph.D. from George Washington University in 1962. He worked for the US Department of Agriculture as a parasitologist till 1972. Since then he has been a Research Associate in Botany with the National Museum of Natural History (Smithsonian Institution) in Washington, D.C. Member of the Botanical Society of America.

Achievements 
He is best known for the Goldberg system, a treatise on the classification, evolution, and phylogeny of the Monocotyledon and Dicotyledons.

Work 
Aaron Goldberg (1967). "The genus Melochia L. (Sterculiaceae)". Contributions from the United States National Herbarium, Vol. 34, pt. 5. 
 
 

Aaron Goldberg and Harry A. Alden (2005). Taxonomy of Haptanthus Goldberg & C. Nelson, Systematic Botany, 30(4): pp. 773–778
Aaron Goldberg. "Genus Melochia (Sterculiaceae)", Flora North America  in press

References 

American botanical writers
1917 births
2014 deaths
Smithsonian Institution people
American male non-fiction writers
20th-century American botanists
Brooklyn College alumni